The Mixed 10 metre air pistol competition at the 2015 European Games in Baku, Azerbaijan was held on 18 June at the Baku Shooting Centre.

Schedule
All times are local (UTC+5).

Records

Results

Semi-final

Semi-final 1

Semi-final 2

Finals

Bronze medal match

Gold medal match

References

External links

Mixed 10 metre air pistol